Alessio Bidoli (born 1986) is an Italian violinist.

Biography

Musical education
Bidoli started learning the violin at age 7, and by the age of 17 he made his debut as a soloist at the Signorelli Theatre in Cortona. He then studied at the Milan Conservatory, from where he graduated in 2006. He was then admitted to the Lausanne Conservatory in Salzburg under Pierre Amoyal, and then the Accademia Musicale Chigiana in Siena under Salvatore Accardo.

Career
He has performed and collaborated with Bruno Canino, with whom he has recorded a number of albums. He has featured with Vittorio Sgarbi in the theatre project Il Fin la Maraviglia, an account of the Baroque age via images and sounds, which was performed at the theatre in Chiasso (Switzerland) in 2015.
In April 2009, he developed a viral infection that led to his becoming tetraplegic, due to Guillain-Barré syndrome, but succeeded in playing the violin again two years later. Bidoli has appeared as guest artist in radio broadcasts on Radio France, NDR Kultur, Radio Svizzera Italiana and Rai Radio 3.
After teaching for some years at the Conservatory Francesco Cilea in Reggio Calabria, he is currently a violin teacher at the Conservatory Niccolò Piccinni in Bari. He regularly holds masterclasses for violin and chamber music in various Italian cities and is the art director of Musica in Corte Festival in Crema.

Recordings
A selection of Bidoli's recorded output includes;

 2022: with Bruno Canino (piano), Alain Meunier (cello) - Freitas Branco Complete Violin Sonatas and Piano Trio, Sony Classical
 2021: with Stefania Mormone (piano) -  Saint-Saëns / Wieniawski / Grieg / Ponce / Elgar / Debussy  (reissue), Da Vinci Classics 
 2020: with Bruno Canino (piano), Massimo Mercelli (flute) and Nicoletta Sanzin (harp) - Rota Chamber Works, Decca - Universal Music Group
2019: with Bruno Canino - Verdi Fantasias (reissue), Concerto Classics
2018: with Bruno Canino - Saint Saëns Violin Sonatas, Warner Classics
2017: with Bruno Canino - Poulenc, Ravel, Stravinskij, Prokofiev, Warner Classics
2016: with Bruno Canino - Italian Soul - Anima italiana, Sony Classical
2013: with Bruno Canino (piano) - Verdi: Fantasias for Violin and Piano, Sony Classical
2011: with Stefania Mormone (piano) -  Saint-Saëns / Wieniawski / Grieg / Ponce / Elgar / Debussy  (reissue), Amadeus magazine

References

External links

Alessio Bidoli official website

1986 births
Living people
Musicians from Milan
Italian classical violinists
Male violinists
21st-century classical violinists
21st-century Italian male musicians
21st-century Italian musicians
Milan Conservatory alumni
Accademia Musicale Chigiana alumni